Cyclogomphus is a genus of dragonfly in the family Gomphidae. It contains the following species:

Cyclogomphus flavoannulatus 
Cyclogomphus gynostylus 
Cyclogomphus heterostylus 
Cyclogomphus vesiculosus 
Cyclogomphus wilkinsi 
Cyclogomphus ypsilon

References

Gomphidae
Anisoptera genera
Taxa named by Edmond de Sélys Longchamps
Taxonomy articles created by Polbot